Sanctuary Records Group Limited was a record label based in the United Kingdom and is as of 2013 a subsidiary of BMG Rights Management solely for reissues. Until June 2007, it was the largest independent record label in the UK and the largest music management company in the world. It was also the world's largest independent owner of music intellectual property rights, with over 160,000 songs.

History
The company was formed in 1979 by Rod Smallwood and Andy Taylor, who met as undergraduates at Trinity College, Cambridge. In 1979, they discovered Iron Maiden in a London pub and went on to manage the group. They named the record company after the band's song "Sanctuary," which was released as a single in 1980, and later included on American pressings as well as the reissued CD version of their 1980 eponymous debut album.

Sanctuary Records has historically signed artists with long-term appeal that have had a long career and steady fan base.

Between 1989 and 1991, Sanctuary was co-owned by the Zomba Group, whose music publishing arm still held the music of Iron Maiden in 2001.

In 1994, the company diversified. Amongst the new media interests included a joint venture with screenwriter and producer, Raymond Thompson, which evolved into the Cloud9 Screen Entertainment Group.

Iron Maiden's back catalog was re-issued by Sanctuary in conjunction with Columbia/SME Records in the US in 2002.

Kenny Rogers' 1980s back catalog (originally released on RCA Records) was re-issued by Sanctuary's Castle Music label in conjunction with Kenny Rogers' Dreamcatcher Records in the UK.  The albums were only available as imports in the US. Rogers' 2003 release "Back To The Well" was released by Sanctuary in the UK.

Mayan Records was an imprint of Sanctuary Records, under which Lordi's UK album The Monster Show was released.

2006 saw Sanctuary's notable twentieth anniversary release of CD86: 48 Tracks from the Birth of Indie Pop, a reissue of the pivotal UK independent compilation C86.

The company incurred significant losses in its 2004 and 2005 fiscal years. Sanctuary's losses in 2005 increased to £142.6m from £26.7m in 2004. In October 2005, the company announced that one quarter of its staff, representing 175 positions, would be eliminated. One such layoff was John Kalodner, senior vice-president of A&R, with over thirty years of industry experience.

The company partly blamed the loss increase on record release delays, while announcing, in early 2006, a £110m rescue deal. These events, plus pressure from the UK financial and business leaders led to Smallwood becoming merely a general manager of the company, Taylor becoming Chief Executive and former British Airways chief executive Bob Ayling being installed as the new Chairman. On 26 May 2006, Ayling dismissed Taylor, following a review of accounting practices prompted by inquiries from the Financial Reporting Review Panel. The board's publicly stated reason for the dismissal was "that certain of the prior year adjustments made in the 2005 accounts should have been presented as a correction of fundamental errors and not as changes in accounting policy". Taylor was replaced by Frank Presland, the chief executive of Sanctuary-owned Twenty-First Artists Management.

In July 2006, it was reported that MAMA, the management group behind the Kaiser Chiefs and Franz Ferdinand and headed by Mean Fiddler chief Dean James, had bid for the group. This proved unsuccessful, further depressing the share value of the company. In late 2006, Rod Smallwood left the company, taking with him Iron Maiden's management interests.
 
In April 2007, Billboard reported that Sanctuary Records would cease to exist as a new release label in the US that summer, though catalog, licensing, and new media operations would continue. On 15 June 2007 Universal Music Group announced it had reached an agreement to buy Sanctuary Records for £44.5 million. The agreement was completed in October 2007. By December 2007, it appeared that the Sanctuary name had begun to be phased out, with both Morrissey and Robert Plant being transferred to the Universal-owned Decca Music Group and Iron Maiden to Universal Music Enterprises (with distribution by Sony Music Entertainment, a successor to Sanctuary and Columbia's distribution partnership for the band's releases) for future releases.

On 21 September 2012, regulators approved Universal Music Group's planned acquisition of EMI from Citibank for £1.2 billion. However, due to conditions imposed by the European Commission, UMG was required to sell Sanctuary. It was one of the three units of Universal Music, never fully owned by EMI, that were forced to be sold; other such units were Vivendi Entertainment and V2 Records. BMG Rights Management acquired Sanctuary for over €46 million. In June 2013, BMG agreed to have INgrooves distribute the label's catalogue in North America, while the PIAS Group would handle international rights; however, Black Sabbath's catalogue remained at Universal until March 2014, when BMG took over the band's distribution. In March 2017, BMG transferred the distribution rights of select Sanctuary artists to Warner Music Group's ADA division.

Labels catalogue
Castle Communications
CMC International
Jet Records (except Electric Light Orchestra and Lynsey De Paul)
Mayan Records
Neat Records
Noise Records
Pye Records (except DJM Records catalogue, property of Universal Music)
RAS Records
Trojan Records (except Bob Marley, property of Tuff Gong and JAD Records)
Urban Records

Former artists
Iron Maiden are one of the last artists currently signed to Sanctuary, which released their album, The Book of Souls in North America, on 4 September 2015.

 3 Colours Red
 Aberfeldy
 Allman Brothers Band (Hittin' the Note)
 Marc Almond
 Angelou
 Anthrax
 Apollyon Sun
 The Ataris
 Atomkraft
 Andy Bell
 Belle & Sebastian - Rough Trade Records
 Biohazard
 Bizarre - Urban Division
 Black Sabbath (except the US and Canada)
 Blondie
 Blue Nile
 Blue Öyster Cult
 Blues Traveler
 Brides of Destruction
 Eric Burdon
 The Charlatans - Creole Records
 Corrosion of Conformity
 The Cranberries
 The Damned
 De La Soul - Urban Division
 Deaf School
 Bruce Dickinson
 Rob Dickinson
 Dio
 Discharge
 Peter DiStefano
 Dokken
 DragonForce
 Drowning Pool
 Earth, Wind and Fire - Urban Division
 Emerson, Lake & Palmer (label outside the US, Canada, and Japan)
 Engerica
 Europe
 Ex Cathedra
 The Fall
 Fun Lovin' Criminals
 Gamma Ray
 The Gathering
 Thea Gilmore
 Gizmachi
 Gorky's Zygotic Mynci
 Gravity Kills
 Adam Green
 Groove Armada
 Helloween
 The Hiss
 Humble Pie
 Idlewild - Pye Records
 Billy Idol
 IllScarlett
 Jane's Addiction
 Jimmy Chamberlin Complex
 JoBoxers
 Jon B. - Urban Division 
 Elton John
 Journey
 King Crimson
 The Kinks
 Kiss
 Living Colour
 Lowgold
 Lynyrd Skynyrd
 Manic Street Preachers
 Marillion (US and UK)
 The Marmalade
 Christine McVie (except North America)
 Marc Brierley
 Meat Loaf
 Megadeth
 Ministry
 Morrissey - Attack Records
 Alison Moyet
 Ocean Colour Scene
 Sally Oldfield
 Oleander
 Jo O'Meara
 Orange Goblin
 William Orbit
 Dolores O'Riordan
 Kelly Osbourne
 Overkill
 Pet Shop Boys
 Photek
 Pitchshifter
 Robert Plant and the Strange Sensation
 Play
 Alan Price and The Electric Blues Company
 Queensrÿche
 Joey Ramone
 Ray J - Urban Division 
 Kenny Rogers
 Rollins Band
 Bruce Ruffin
 The RZA - Urban Division 
 Saint Etienne
 Scorpions
 Simple Minds
 Siouxsie and the Banshees
 The Small Faces
 Status Quo
 Stratovarius
 The Strokes - Rough Trade Records (UK only)
 Styx
 Super Furry Animals
 Tangerine Dream ("Pink Years" and "Blue Years" albums)
 Tegan and Sara
 Tesla
 Uriah Heep
 Venom
 Virgin Steele
 Vixen - CMC International (US only; Eagle in Europe)
 Ween
 Widespread Panic
 Within Temptation (UK only)
 Wu-Tang Clan - Urban Division 
 Neil Young

See also
 List of record labels

References

External links
 Official website
 Official retail website
 Official corporate website
 Sanctuary Records Altsounds.com profile

British record labels
Record labels established in 1976
Rock record labels
Alternative rock record labels
IFPI members
Labels distributed by Warner Music Group
Defunct record labels of the United Kingdom
1976 establishments in the United Kingdom